The Dineen Group is an Australian owner of bus and coach companies in New South Wales and Victoria.

History
In the early 1960s Bill Dineen ran a school run in Trafalgar. In 1968 he purchased Workmen's Comfort Coaches of Trafalgar followed by Warragul Bus Lines. Heyfield Bus Lines was acquired circa 1984. In June 1985 Westenport Roadlines was purchased followed in October 1990 by Panorama Coaches from Don Nugent with 13 buses and coaches. In May 1991 Hurstbridge Coaches was purchased and later merged with Panorama Coaches. In 1995, Berwick Bus Lines was purchased.

In 2002, Sandringham & Brighton Coaches was acquired.

In September 2006, McKenzie's Tourist Services, Healesville was purchased and in November 2011 Martyrs Bus Service.

In November 2013 Cann's Bus Lines, Corowa was purchased.

In January 2017, Snowliner Coaches, Cooma was purchased from Evans Family.

In July 2017, Cavanagh Bus Group Kempsey was purchased from the Cavanagh's.

In February 2021, Latrobe Valley Buslines were purchased.

In June 2021, Symes Coaches of Inverell were purchased.

In September 2021, Inverell Bus Service was purchased.

In September 2021, Moons Buslines was purchased.

In June 2022, Experience Bus Hire & Charter was purchased. All associated trading names were removed from service.

Fleet
As at June 2021, the Dineen Group operated 500 buses and coaches Australian Bus Fleet Lists under the following brands: Victoria  and New South Wales 
 Berwick Bus Lines - 61
 Martyrs Bus Lines, Warburton - 50
 Panorama Coaches, Diamond Creek -78
 Westernport Road Lines, Koo Wee Rup - 71
 Sandringham & Brighton Coaches, Moorabbin - 18
 McKenzie's Tourist Services, Healesville - 62
 Heyfield Bus Lines - 24
 Warragul Bus Lines - 88
 Cann Corowa - 28
 Snowliner Coaches - 14
 Cavanagh's Bus & Coach - 56
 Latrobe Valley Bus lines - 131
Symes Coaches - 22
 Inverell Bus Service
 Total - 703

References

Bus companies of Australia